Ryan Reynolds is a Canadian actor and producer who has appeared in films, television series, videos, and video games. Reynolds made his acting debut on television in the teen drama Fifteen in 1990. Two years later, he made his feature film debut by playing an orphan raised in India, who is inspired by Mahatma Gandhi to go on a hunger strike in a small town in Canada in Ordinary Magic (1993). Reynolds had a recurring role on the television show The Odyssey (1993). He followed this with minor appearances on The X-Files (1996), and the television film Sabrina the Teenage Witch (1996). His breakthrough role was as medical student Michael "Berg" Bergen in the sitcom Two Guys and a Girl.

He also played a slacker in National Lampoon's Van Wilder (2002), and vampire hunter Hannibal King in Blade: Trinity (2004) with Wesley Snipes. Reynolds appeared in lead roles in the commercially successful romantic comedies Just Friends (2005), Definitely, Maybe (2008), and The Proposal (2009). In 2010, he played a military contractor who is captured by terrorists in the psychological thriller Buried. The following year, Reynolds starred in the title role of the superhero film Green Lantern, which received a generally negative reception from the critics and underperformed at the box office leading to a decline in his career. In 2013, he voiced a garden snail in Turbo and a caveman in The Croods. Two years later, he appeared in the drama Mississippi Grind and played lawyer E. Randol Schoenberg in Woman in Gold.

Reynolds experienced a career turnaround when he played the titular antihero in the superhero film Deadpool (2016), which he also produced. It received generally positive reviews from the critics especially for his irreverent comedic performance, and Reynolds garnered a nomination for the Golden Globe Award for Best Actor – Motion Picture Musical or Comedy. The film was also a commercial success, grossing a worldwide total of over $782 million at the box-office. He reprised the role in its 2018 sequel Deadpool 2, which received generally positive reviews from critics, and was a commercial success. It became the highest grossing R-rated film with a worldwide gross of over $785 million. The following year, he voiced Pikachu in the film Detective Pikachu (2019).

Film

Television

Video games

Music and web videos

Notes

References

External links
 

Male actor filmographies
American filmographies
Canadian filmographies